A stupika is a small votive stupa. It is often accompanied by small votive tablets with Buddhist formulae, or small Buddhist images. The stupika can also be the topmost part of a building, particularly a Hindu temple.

References